Sulphogaeana is a genus of cicadas found in Asia from the Himalayas east to Laos. They were earlier included in the genus Gaeana.

Species
Species in the genus include:
 Sulphogaeana dolicha Lei, 1997
 Sulphogaeana sulphurea ((Westwood, 1839)
 Sulphogaeana vestita (Distant, 1905)

References

External links

Image of S. sulphurea on Cicada Mania

Gaeanini
Cicadidae genera
Hemiptera of Asia